Mastax poecila is a species of beetle in the family Carabidae found in Cambodia, China and Singapore.

References

Mastax poecila
Beetles of Asia
Beetles described in 1863